The 2010 Connecticut House of Representatives election was held on Tuesday, November 2, 2010 to elect members to the Connecticut House of Representatives, one from each of the state's 151 General Assembly districts. The date of this the election corresponded with other elections in the state, including ones for governor, U.S. Senate, and the Connecticut State Senate.

Representatives elected served a two-year term which began in January 2011.

Current composition
The Connecticut House of Representatives is, as of February 11, 2010, composed of 114 Democrats and 37 Republicans.

2010 Connecticut elections
House 2010
Connecticut House of Representatives